Thandi River is a river of Burma.

The Thandi River lies in Burma's southern region of Ayeyarwady. It is a tributary of the Irrawaddy River. The course of the river passes through areas sparsely populated with an average of 266 people inhabiting every square kilometer of land.

The Thandi River is also known as Thandeik River. Towns and settlements near the river include Kyônda, Donyan, Kyònbaw, Begyi, Kyôndat, Nyaungleingôn and Thandi.

References

See also
List of rivers of Burma

Rivers of Myanmar